The 2010 European Champion Cup Final Four was an international baseball competition held in Barcelona, Spain on September 25–26, 2010. It featured the 4 best teams of the 2010 European Cup, and it was won by Fortitudo Baseball Bologna.

Teams
The following four teams qualified for the 2010 Final Four.

External links
Schedule

References

Final Four (Baseball), 2010
2010
European Champion Cup Final Four